"Sitting on the fence" is a common idiom used in English to describe a person's lack of decisiveness, neutrality or hesitance to choose between two sides in an argument or a competition, or inability to decide due to lack of courage. This is done either in order to remain on good terms with both sides, or due to apathy regarding the situation and not wanting to choose a position with which one doesn't actually agree. As a result, someone who "sits on the fence" will maintain a neutral and non-committal view regarding any of the other parties involved.

References

See also
 Ambivalence
 Cold feet
 Mugwump

English-language idioms